Dønski is a village in Viken county, Norway.

References

Villages in Akershus